FK Olympia Prague was a Czech football club located originally in the Střížkov district of Prague, Czech Republic. It competes in the Bohemian Football League, the third tier of football in the country.

History 
Olympia Prague was a successor club to FC Olympia Hradec Králové. In 2017, after Olympia Hradec Králové finished second in the Bohemian Football League and won promotion to the Czech National Football League, a fully professional competition, their players and staff moved to Prague and formed a newly founded club under the name FK Olympia Prague. The cited reason for this move was that their home stadium did not meet the requirements for professional football and the only stadium in Hradec Králové that did was already in use by FK Hradec Králové, another Czech National Football League club. Despite staying clear of the relegation zone in their first season in the second-tier league, chairman Angelos Goulis announced the club had decided to willingly move one tier down the football pyramid into the Bohemian Football League. The club relocated from Střížkov to Radotín and rebranded itself under its current name. As a part of this move, the club also merged with SC Radotín, a local lower-league club.

Players

Last squad 

 (on loan from Bohemians)

 (on loan from Bohemians)

 (on loan from Atromitos)

 (on loan from Slavia Prague)
 (on loan from Zilina B)

Managers 
 Miloš Sazima (2017)
 Vladimír Skalba (2017)
 Motti Ivanir (2017–2018)
 Oldřich Pařízek (2018)
 David Jarolím (2018-2019)

References

External links 
 Official website 

Olympia Radotín
Defunct football clubs in the Czech Republic
Association football clubs established in 2017
Association football clubs disestablished in 2018